The 1927 USC Trojans football team represented the University of Southern California (USC) in the 1927 college football season. In their third year under head coach Howard Jones, the Trojans compiled an 8–1–1 record (4–0–1 against conference opponents), tied with Stanford and Idaho for the Pacific Coast Conference championship, and outscored their opponents by a combined total of 287 to 64. The season featured the first game in the Notre Dame–USC football rivalry; Notre Dame won by a 13 to 12 score in Los Angeles. The team was ranked No. 10 in the nation in the Dickinson System ratings released in December 1927.

Schedule

References

USC
USC Trojans football seasons
Pac-12 Conference football champion seasons
USC Trojans football